Cambie may refer to:

Henry John Cambie (1836–1928), Ireland-born engineer of the Canadian Pacific Railway chiefly responsible for having Vancouver, British Columbia, designated the terminus of Canada's transcontinental railroad

Things named for Henry John Cambie
Cambie Street, Vancouver
Cambie Bridge, Vancouver
Cambie Road and Henry James Cambie Secondary School in Richmond, British Columbia
Aberdeen station (TransLink), formerly "Cambie Station", in Richmond, British Columbia